Pleasant Valley Township is a township in Finney County, Kansas, USA.  As of the 2000 census, its population was 139.

Geography

Transportation
Pleasant Valley Township contains one airport or landing strip, Air-Ag Airport.

References
 USGS Geographic Names Information System (GNIS)

External links
 City-Data.com

Townships in Finney County, Kansas
Townships in Kansas